Jacobo González Rodrigáñez (born 25 March 1997), sometimes known simply as Jacobo, is a Spanish footballer who plays for FC Andorra. Mainly a right winger, he can also play as a right back.

Club career
Born in Madrid, Jacobo joined Real Madrid's youth setup in 2009, aged 12. On 9 July 2016 he moved to neighbouring AD Alcorcón, being assigned to the reserves in the Tercera División.

On 20 August 2016 Jacobo made his professional debut, starting in a 0–0 home draw against SD Huesca in the Segunda División. On 30 December, he was loaned to Segunda División B side CF Rayo Majadahonda until the end of the season.

On 14 August 2017, Jacobo signed for CF Villanovense in the third division. The following 13 June, he agreed to a two-year contract with fellow league team Celta de Vigo B.

Jacobo made his first team – and La Liga – debut for the Galicians on 27 June 2020, starting in a 2–2 home draw against FC Barcelona. On 7 August, he agreed to a three-year contract with CD Tenerife in the second division.

Jacobo scored his first professional goal on 13 September 2020, netting his team's second in a 2–0 home win over Málaga CF. On 26 July 2021, after featuring sparingly, he moved to CE Sabadell FC of the Primera División RFEF.

On 21 July 2022, after scoring a career-best 13 goals, Jacobo signed a two-year deal with FC Andorra, newly-promoted to the second level.

References

External links

1997 births
Living people
Footballers from Madrid
Spanish footballers
Association football wingers
La Liga players
Segunda División players
Primera Federación players
Segunda División B players
Tercera División players
AD Alcorcón B players
AD Alcorcón footballers
CF Rayo Majadahonda players
CF Villanovense players
Celta de Vigo B players
RC Celta de Vigo players
CD Tenerife players
CE Sabadell FC footballers
FC Andorra players